Sophia Johnston  (1730-1810), was a Scottish carpenter and blacksmith, regarded to be the first origin of the Robin Gray song.

References 
 The Biographical Dictionary of Scottish Women (Hardcover) by Elizabeth L. Ewan, Sue Innes
 A procession of notable Scottish Women through Time

1730 births
1810 deaths
18th-century Scottish people
19th-century Scottish people
Scottish carpenters
British blacksmiths